Yang Berhormat Young Syefura Othman (born 10 November 1989), nicknamed Rara, is a Malaysian politician who has served as the Member of Parliament (MP) for Bentong since November 2022. She served as Member of the Pahang State Legislative Assembly (MLA) for Ketari from May 2018 to November 2022. She is a member of the Democratic Action Party, a component party of the Pakatan Harapan (PH) coalition. She has also served as Deputy Youth Chief of DAP since March 2022. Additionally, she became the first Malay to represent the constituency ever since its inception.

Personal life

Miscarriage of pregnancy
On 10 November 2022 during her 33rd birthday, Young Syefura was confirmed to have suffered a miscarriage after eight weeks of pregnancy and was resting at home. She also revealed that she had initially wanted to announce her pregnancy after the 2022 general election with a photograph of her home pregnancy test. She also shared that her pregnancy had appeared to stall after six weeks. She then thanked those who have extended their messages of support to her. Upon hearing the news, her opponent, fellow candidate for the Bentong federal seat in the election and former Bentong MP Liow Tiong Lai from the opposing Barisan Nasional (BN) and the Malaysian Chinese Association (MCA) expressed his sadness and sent his best and sincerest wishes and care for Young Syefura to recuperate well. In response, Young Syefura thanked Liow and apologised for her absence in the PH and DAP operations room and being unable to meet him during the campaign trail and his visit to there as she was at home. The reported reason for her miscarriage was overwork. Despite being at home, her campaign continued.

Election results

References

External links
 
 
 

Living people
1989 births
21st-century Malaysian politicians